Blairville, Michigan is a farming community in Chippewa County, Michigan.  It was founded in 1880 by William H. Wise and named for his father-in-law, who settled there the following year.  The founders were Irish-Canadian immigrants.

Sources

Populated places in Chippewa County, Michigan
Populated places established in 1880
1880 establishments in Michigan